Russ Powell (September 16, 1875 – November 28, 1950) was an American film actor.  He appeared in 186 films between 1915 and 1943. He was born in Indianapolis, Indiana, and died in Los Angeles, California.

Selected filmography

 The Fashion Shop (1915, Short) - Fat Customer
 The Tale of the Night Before (1915) - Henry's friend
 Fat and Furious (1917) - Merta's Father
 Clean Sweep (1918) - The Butcher
 Smoldering Embers (1920) - Tramp
 Dangerous Days (1920) - Bartender (uncredited)
 The Slim Princess (1920) - The Governor General
 The Soul of Youth (1920) - Patrolman Jones
 One Stolen Night (1923)
 Kindled Courage (1923) - Marshal
 The Hunchback of Notre Dame (uncredited)  (1923)
 A Boy of Flanders - Baas Kronstadt (1924)
 Open All Night (1924) (uncredited)
 Dynamite Smith (1924)
 The Wheel (1925)
 The Red Mill (1927)
 Tillie the Toiler (1927) (uncredited)
 Soft Cushions (1927)
 Why Sailors Go Wrong (1928) (uncredited)
 Vamping Venus (1928)
 The Cossacks (1928) (uncredited)
 Napoleon's Barber (1928 short)
 Riley the Cop (1928) (uncredited)
 Sailor's Holiday (1929) (uncredited)
 Safety in Numbers (1930) (uncredited)
 The Big Trail (1930) (uncredited)
 Check and Double Check (1930)
 The Grand Parade (1930)
 The Sin Ship (1931)
 The Public Enemy (1931) (uncredited)
 An American Tragedy (1931)
 The Sin of Madelon Claudet (1931)
 Lady and Gent (1932)
 King Kong (1933) - Watchman (uncredited)
 Central Airport (1933) (uncredited)
 Roman Scandals (1933) (uncredited)
 The House on 56th Street (1933) (uncredited)
 The Count of Monte Cristo (1934) (uncredited)
 Call of the Wild (1935)
 The Three Musketeers (1935) (uncredited)
 Barbary Coast (1935) (uncredited)
 A Night at the Opera (1935) (uncredited)
 Divot Diggers (1936, Short) (voice)
 A Day at the Races (1937) (uncredited)
 The Emperor's Candlesticks (1937) (uncredited)
 Stella Dallas (1937) (uncredited)
 The Prisoner of Zenda (1937) (uncredited)
 The Wrong Road (1937)
 The Cowboy and the Lady (1938) (uncredited)
 Santa Fe Stampede (1938) (uncredited)
 Son of Frankenstein (1939) (uncredited)
 I Stole a Million (1939) (uncredited)
 The Hunchback of Notre Dame (1939) (uncredited)
 When the Daltons Rode (1940) (uncredited)
 The Return of Frank James (1940) (uncredited)
 Citizen Kane (1941) (uncredited)
 Action in the North Atlantic (1943) (uncredited)

References

External links

1875 births
1950 deaths
20th-century American male actors
American male film actors
American male silent film actors
Male actors from Indiana